Edda are poems and tales of Norse mythology. It may also refer to:

 Edda (given name), a list of people
 Edda people, a sub-group of the Igbo ethnic group in south-east Nigeria, also the ancestral home of the Edda people
 The ancestress of serfs in the Rígsþula
 Edda Award, Icelandic film and television award
 Edda Media, Norwegian media group
 Edda Művek, Hungarian rock band
 673 Edda, minor planet orbiting the Sun
 Ethylenediaminediacetic acid (EDDA), a chelating agent
 Edda. Scandinavian Journal of Literary Research
 Edda, a fictional Norwegian town in which the Netflix series Ragnarok is set. Based on the real-life Odda.

Other uses 
 Alejandro Edda, (born 1984) Mexican-American actor